Ann Pirvu (born May 25, 1987) is a Romanian-Canadian actress and producer from Toronto, Ontario. She is best known for her roles in the television series Reign, Remedy, The Girlfriend Experience and Workin' Moms.

Early life and education 
Pirvu was born into a family of engineers in Brașov, Romania, where she developed a keen interest in poetry and history. As a child she performed in national talent shows and won several awards. Her family moved to Canada when she was 12 years old. She grew up in Edmonton, Alberta.

She has a Bachelor's degree in Broadcast journalism from Ryerson University and an International Baccalaureate Diploma.

Career 

Pirvu portrayed Nicole Touchet in the CW's series Reign, appearing in the fourth season. She is currently portraying the role of Trish on the television series Workin' Moms.

Filmography

Video games

References

External links 

Ann Pirvu profile

Living people
Canadian film actresses
Canadian people of Romanian descent
1987 births
People from Brașov
Actresses from Edmonton
Canadian television actresses
21st-century Canadian actresses
Toronto Metropolitan University alumni